Codgers is a 2006 stage play by Don Reid that was later turned into a 2011 comedy film of the same name by Wayne Harrison. The play won a 2006 Rodney Seaborn Playwright's Award, and toured nationally in 2010.

Reid created a companion play for Codgers entitled Biddies, which released in 2012.

Summary 
The film follows five elderly men that meet weekly at their local gym to talk and spend time together. When a newcomer threatens their friendships, the group must overcome the temporary setbacks and find a way to overcome these new issues.

Reception
The play was positively received by the Australian Stage and Sydney Morning Herald, with the Morning Herald writing that it was a "pleasant, simple and heart-warming comedy about ageing and its possible wisdoms".

Film adaptation
The play was adapted into a feature film directed by Wayne Harrison and starring Ronald Falk, Ron Haddrick, and Edwin Hodgeman. The film premiered at the Parramatta Riverside Theatre on 24 June 2011 and was released to video on demand through Titan View in 2013.

Biddies
In 2012 Reid released Biddies as a companion piece to Codgers. The play featured a similar plot device as its predecessor, centering on five older women and former schoolmates that are gathering together to sew a project for their former school. The play starred Maggie Blinco, Annie Byron, Vivienne Garrett, Julie Hudspeth, Donna Lee, and Linden Wilkinson, and received mixed reviews.

References

External links
 
 

Australian comedy films
2011 films
2011 comedy films
2006 plays
Australian plays
Films based on plays
Australian plays adapted into films
2010s Australian films